The Act may refer to:

 The Act (band), a Norwegian rock band from the 1980s
 The Act (musical), a 1977 musical
 The Act (1989 film), a 1989 British television film by Richard Langridge in the anthology series ScreenPlay
 The Act (video game), a 2007 arcade game produced by Cecropia
 The Act (TV series), a 2019 true crime TV series

See also 

 Act (disambiguation)
 Australian Capital Territory